Sentimiento Latino is a 2006 album of Latin American popular and classical songs by Juan Diego Flórez with the Fort Worth Symphony Orchestra Chamber Ensemble, conducted by Miguel Harth-Bedoya for Decca.

The album features guest artists Daniel Binelli, Mariachi de Oro, Swang Lin, Xiao-Hua Sheng, Eugene Cherkasov, David Gálvez, Michael Shih,  Adriana Voirin DeCosta, Laura Bruton, Karen Basrak, William Clay, Shields-Collins Bray

Track list
 Pedro Elias Gutierrez (1870–1954) Alma Llanera
 José Alfredo Jiménez: Ella
 Chabuca Granda: La Flor de la Canela
 Carlos Gardel: (1890–1935) El Día Que Me Quieras
 Agustin Lara: (1900–1970) Granada (song)
 Anon.: La Jarra de Oro
 José Padilla Sánchez: (1889–1960) Princesita
 Maria Grever: (1894–1951) Júrame
 Manuel María Ponce: (1882–1948) Estrellita
 Chabuca Granda: Fina Estampa
 Noel Estrada: En mi viejo San Juan
 Ernesto Lecuona: Siboney
 Nilo Menéndez: Aquellos Ojos Verdes
 Chabuca Granda: Bello Durmiente 
 Chucho Monge: México Lindo y Querido

Charts

References

2006 classical albums